Enzo "Franco" Volpi (16 August 1936 - 14 March 2013) was an Italian long-distance runner.

He was also the coach of the New York City Marathon past winner Gianni Poli.

Career
Five-time national champion at senior level in three different specialities from 1956 to 1960, boasts 8 caps in the Italy national athletics team.

He was national recordman in 5000 m and 10,000 m.

National records
 5000 m: 14:31.0 ( Bari, 17 October 1957) - holder until 5 June 1958
 10,000 m: 30:05.8 ( Rome, 13 September 1957) - holder until 25 September 1960

Achievements
He won two times the senior race at the important cross country running International competition Campaccio, held every in San Giorgio su Legnano, Italy from 1957. He won the first edition and a second time five years later.

Campaccio
Senior race: 1957, 1962

National titles
Volpi won five national championships at individual senior level.

Italian Athletics Championships
10,000 m: 1956, 1959
3000 m steeplechase: 1960
Italian Cross Country Championships
Long course: 1957, 1960

References

External links
 Enzo Volpi at Asai Bruno Bonomelli
 La “poiana” vola via, addio a Volpi grande del mezzofondo in 

1936 births
2013 deaths
Italian male steeplechase runners
Italian male long-distance runners
Athletics competitors of Gruppo Sportivo Esercito
Italian athletics coaches